Sierra de Cantabria  is a mountain range in the province of Álava, Spain. It contains the Sierra de Toloño.

Cantabria
Geography of Álava